The 2010 ZRE Katowice Bytom Open was a professional tennis tournament played on outdoor red clay courts. It was part of the 2010 ATP Challenger Tour. It took place in Bytom, Poland between 14 and 20 June 2010.

ATP entrants

Seeds

 Rankings are as of May 24, 2010.

Other entrants
The following players received wildcards into the singles main draw:
  Marko Daniš
  Rafał Gozdur
  Grzegorz Panfil
  Adam Vejmělka

The following players received entry from the qualifying draw:
  Adrián García
  Ádám Kellner
  Błażej Koniusz
  Jaroslav Pospíšil

Champions

Singles

 Pere Riba def.  Facundo Bagnis, 6–0, 6–3

Doubles

 Ivo Klec /  Artem Smirnov def.  Konstantin Kravchuk /  Ivan Sergeyev, 1–6, 6–3, [10–3]

References
Official website
ITF search

ZRE Katowice Bytom Open
ZRE Katowice Bytom Open
Zre Katowice Bytom Open, 2010